Austrodrillia albobalteata is a species of sea snail, a marine gastropod mollusk in the family Horaiclavidae.

It was formerly included within the family Turridae.

Description
The length of the shell attains 5 mm, its diameter 2 mm.

This small, brownish shell has a fusiform-ovate shape. It contains 6 whorls, including two convex whorls in the protoconch. It shows 10-12 ribs, Their superior part is almost obsolete and they are almost indistinctly subnodose at the sutures. The oval aperture is small. The outer lip is sharp, slightly ascending at the suture. There is a white band on the body whorl. It is subdivided by a fine line of the same colour as the rest of the shell. A few wavy darker brown lines flow down the lower portion of the body whorl.

Distribution
This marine species occurs in the Atlantic Ocean off St. Helena.

References

External links
  Tucker, J.K. 2004 Catalog of recent and fossil turrids (Mollusca: Gastropoda). Zootaxa 682:1-1295.

albobalteata